Shirley Township may refer to the following townships in the United States:

 Shirley Township, Cloud County, Kansas
 Shirley Township, Ripley County, Missouri
 Shirley Township, Huntingdon County, Pennsylvania